Friedrich Domin (15 May 1902 – 18 December 1961) was a German film actor. He appeared in more than 60 films between 1939 and 1961. He was born in Beuthen, Germany (now Bytom, Poland) and died in Munich, Germany.

Selected filmography

 Das Lied der Wüste (1939) - Sir Collins, ihr Stiefvater
 Der siebente Junge (1941) - Baron Florian von Roeckel
 The Comedians (1941) - Johann Neuber
 Alarmstufe V (1941) - Prof. Crusius
 The Little Residence (1942) - Waldemar Prinz von Lauffenberg
 Fünftausend Mark Belohnung (1942) - Joachim Wengraf
 The Endless Road (1943) - Fürst Metternich
 Man rede mir nicht von Liebe (1943) - Van Italy
 Melusine (1944) - Professor von Hardegg
 Wo ist Herr Belling? (1945) - Dr. Fiedler
 In the Temple of Venus (1948) - Richard Doysen
 The Last Illusion (1949) - Prof. Helfert
 Trouble Backstairs (1949) - Justizrat Dr. Horn, sein Vater
 Regimental Music (1950) - Herr von Wahl
 Nacht ohne Sünde (1950) - Professor Rackmann
 Die Tat des Anderen (1951)
 Das seltsame Leben des Herrn Bruggs (1951) - Bankdirektor Reisch
 Die Frauen des Herrn S. (1951) - Mazedonischer General
 The Sergeant's Daughter (1952) - Wachtmeister Volkhardt
 The Great Temptation (1952) - Dr. Frank, Verteidiger
 The Divorcée (1953) - Gerichtsvorsitzender
 Meines Vaters Pferde (1954, part 1, 2) - Professor
 The Abduction of the Sabine Women (1954) - Dichter
 Cabaret (1954) - Paul Lincke
 Sauerbruch – Das war mein Leben (1954) - Paul von Hindenburgh
 Hubertus Castle (1954) - Graf Egge
 The Confession of Ina Kahr (1954) - Vater Stoll
 Ludwig II (1955) - Otto von Bismarck
 Marianne of My Youth (1955) - Professor
 Beloved Enemy (1955) - Mr. Trapp
 Eine Frau genügt nicht? (1955)
 Love's Carnival (1955) - Kommerzienrat Wagner
 Lola Montès (1955) - Circus Manager
 The Girl from Flanders (1956) - Maj. Gen Leopold Haller, Alex's Father
 San Salvatore (1956) - Dr. Breymann
 The Captain from Köpenick (1956) - Jail Director
 The Trapp Family (1956) - Gruber, Bankier
 Heiße Ernte (1956) - Rudolf Stammer
 Kleiner Mann – ganz groß (1957) - Theodor Krüger
 Queen Louise (1957) - Herzog von Mecklenburg-Strelitz
 Goodbye, Franziska (1957) - Professor Thiemann
 Der Edelweißkönig (1957) - Untersuchungsrichter
 The Big Chance (1957) - Bischof
 Immer wenn der Tag beginnt (1957) - Professor Wächter
 ...und nichts als die Wahrheit (1958) - Dr. Fein, Strafverteidiger
 Worüber man nicht spricht - Frauenarzt Dr. Brand greift ein (1958) - Professor Julius Gruber
 Die Landärztin vom Tegernsee (1958) - Pfarrer
 The Ideal Woman (1959) - Justizrat Becker
 The Man Who Walked Through the Wall (1959) - Psychiater (uncredited)
 Ja, so ein Mädchen mit sechzehn (1959) - Franz Vidal
 Heimat, deine Lieder (1959) - Gärtner Kummernus
 Sweetheart of the Gods (1960) - Herr Matthieu
 Carnival Confession (1960) - Canon Henrici
 A Woman for Life (1960) - Vater Heinemann
 Das schwarze Schaf (1960) - Bischof

References

External links

1902 births
1961 deaths
German male film actors
Ernst Busch Academy of Dramatic Arts alumni
People from the Province of Silesia
People from Bytom
20th-century German male actors